Luna Llena (In English: Full Moon ) is the second album by Mexican singer-songwriter Mariana Ochoa, released by Warner Music in Mexico on September 21, 2007 (see 2007 in music).

The album was produced by Rafael Sardina and directed by Cheche Alara, and recorded in Los Angeles, California.

Track listing
"Volvamos a Intentar" (Klaus Derendorf/Tom Nichols/Patrice Tipoki)
"Me Faltas Tú"
"Invisible"
"Aunque No Estés" (Featuring Alex Ubago)
"Pretendes" (Klaus Derendorf/Tom Nichols/Jeeve)
"Te Extraño Tanto"
"Luna Llena"
"Por Siempre" (Klaus Derendorf/Tom Nichols/Jeeve)
"Amor Total" (Tobias Gustavsson/Mia Bergström)
"Con tu Amor"
"Decide o Vete"
"Amar sin Miedo" (Por Él)

Singles
 "Me Faltas Tú"

Credits
Vocals by Mariana Ochoa
Drums by Victor Indrizzo
Drums in "Me Faltas Tú" and "Te Extraño Tanto" by Simon Phillips
Bass by Sean Hurley
Guitars by Fran Iturbe
Additional guitars by Paulo Serpa
Keyboards by Cheche Alara
Percussion by Rafa Padilla
Additional vocals by Edgar Cortazar y Ximena Muñoz

References

External links

Mariana Ochoa albums
2007 albums